French football transfers by club 2008/2009 (winter/summer)

Auxerre 

In:  (Winter)

In:  (Summer)

Out:    (Winter)

Out:    (Summer)

Bordeaux 

In: (Summer)

 €6.5m

Out: (Summer)

Caen 

In: (Summer)

Out: (Summer)

 €6.5m

Grenoble Foot 

In:

Out:

Le Havre 

In: (Summer)

Out: (Summer)

Le Mans 

In:

 £1.1m

Out:

 €8m

Lille 

In:

Out:

 €14m

Lorient 

In:

Out:

Lyon 

In:

 €14m
 €8.5m
 €15m

 €8.4m
 €11m

Out:

 €1.5m
 £9.5m
 £5m
 €5.5m

Marseille 

In:

Summer 08

 £9.5m

Winter 08

Out:

Summer 08

 €16m

Winter 08

AS Monaco 

In:

Out:

Nancy 

In:

Out:

Nantes 

In:

Out:

Nice 

In:

Out:

 €8.5m
 €15m

PSG 

In:

Out:

 €5m
 £1.5m

Rennes 

In:

 €8m

Out:

 €8.4m

 €3m

Sochaux 

In:

Out:

Saint-Étienne 

In:

Summer 08

Out:

Summer 08

Toulouse 

In:

 €3m

Out:

 £5.5m
 £8.2m

Valenciennes 

In:

 £1m

Out:

Transfers
2008
French